Richard Shuttleworth may refer to:

Richard Shuttleworth (MP for Preston) (1587–1669), English politician who sat in the House of Commons variously between 1640 and 1659
Richard Shuttleworth (MP for Clitheroe) (died 1648), English politician who sat in the House of Commons between 1640 and 1648
Richard Shuttleworth (MP for Lancashire) (1683–1749), MP for Lancashire from 1705 to his death
Richard Ormonde Shuttleworth (1909–1940), racing motorist, aviator and prolific collector of veteran cars and aircraft